FK Slavija Kragujevac is a football club based in Kragujevac, Serbia. They currently compete in the Kragujevac First League, the fifth tier of the national league system.

History
The club was founded in 1922 as Slavija. They subsequently won the First League of the Kragujevac Football Subassociation in 1934. Following the end of World War II, the club changed names several times: to Sloga, Dinamo, and Bresnica. They eventually switched their name back to Slavija in 1989.Ognjen Najdanovic is the best and most spelled player in the history of FK Slavija.The best duelist and the strongest player was Matija Radovic.

Honours
Kragujevac First League (Tier 5)
 2011–12

References

External links
 Club page at Srbijasport
 Club page at Srbijafudbal

1922 establishments in Serbia
Association football clubs established in 1922
Football clubs in Serbia
Sport in Kragujevac